Diana Hyland (born Diane Gentner; January 25, 1936 – March 27, 1977) was an American stage, film and television actress.

Early years
Hyland was born Diane Gentner to John Theodore and Mary (Gorman) Gentner in Cleveland Heights, Ohio. She had one sibling, a brother,  John Gorman Gentner.

Career 
She made her acting debut in 1955 at age 19 in an episode of Robert Montgomery Presents. Over the next decade she appeared often in guest and supporting roles in various television series, including Naked City, The Eleventh Hour, The Fugitive, The Invaders and The Twilight Zone as well as cast in the feature film The Chase (1966) with Marlon Brando, Jane Fonda, and Robert Redford.

In 1959, she originated the role of Heavenly Finley in Tennessee Williams' Sweet Bird of Youth on Broadway, appearing with Geraldine Page and Paul Newman.

In 1966, she co-starred in the movie Smoky in which she played Julie Richards, owner of the Rockin' R Ranch, who falls in love with Clint Barkeley (Fess Parker), owner of Smokey, a black stallion turned cutting horse. The same year she appeared in an episode of the TV series The Man from U.N.C.L.E. titled "The Candidate's Wife Affair", and in another episode titled "The Nowhere Affair". From 1958 to 1963, Hyland was a regular on the NBC soap opera Young Doctor Malone, playing Gig Houseman, wife of the younger Dr. Malone.

Hyland's debut in a feature film was in One Man's Way (1963), playing the wife of Norman Vincent Peale. She had a continuing role as Susan Winter in the prime-time soap opera Peyton Place from 1968 to 1969. She appeared in the 1976 television movie The Boy in the Plastic Bubble, for which she won a posthumous Emmy Award. The following year, she co-starred with Dick Van Patten in the series Eight Is Enough, but appeared in only four episodes before her death, and her character, Joan Bradford was written to have died as well.

Personal life
Hyland married actor Joe Goodson on April 24, 1969. The couple had one son, Zachary, born in July 1973. Hyland and Goodson divorced in August 1974.

She began a romantic relationship with actor John Travolta, 18 years her junior, in 1976 after meeting him when she played his mother in the television movie The Boy in the Plastic Bubble.

Death
Hyland was diagnosed with breast cancer in 1977, and underwent a mastectomy. However, the cancer spread and her health deteriorated. Hyland and Travolta remained together until her death at age 41 on March 27, 1977, in Los Angeles.

Filmography

References

External links

Diana Hyland portrait gallery at NY Public Library (Billy Rose collection)

1936 births
1977 deaths
20th-century American actresses
Actresses from Ohio
American film actresses
American soap opera actresses
American stage actresses
American television actresses
Deaths from breast cancer
Deaths from cancer in California
Emmy Award winners
Outstanding Performance by a Supporting Actress in a Miniseries or Movie Primetime Emmy Award winners
People from Cleveland Heights, Ohio
Primetime Emmy Award winners